The 2015 AON Open Challenger was a professional tennis tournament played on clay courts. It was the twelfth edition of the tournament which was part of the 2015 ATP Challenger Tour. It took place in Genoa, Italy between 7 and 13 September 2015.

Singles main-draw entrants

Seeds

 1 Rankings are as of August 31, 2015.

Other entrants
The following players received wildcards into the singles main draw:
  Andrea Basso
  Edoardo Eremin
  Lorenzo Giustino
  Gianluca Mager

The following players received entry from the qualifying draw:
  Sadio Doumbia 
  Juan Carlos Sáez 
  Antonio Šančić 
  Artem Smirnov

Champions

Singles

 Nicolás Almagro def.  Marco Cecchinato 6–7(1–7), 6–1, 6–4

Doubles

 Guillermo Durán /  Horacio Zeballos  def.  Andrea Arnaboldi /  Alessandro Giannessi 7–5, 6–4

External links
Official Website

AON Open Challenger
AON Open Challenger
AON Open Challenger
AON Open Challenger
21st century in Genoa